White Mill is a smock mill west of Sandwich, Kent, England that was built in 1760. The mill has been restored and is open to the public as part of the White Mill Rural Heritage Centre.  The museum also includes the miller's cottage, which has been furnished to appear as it did between 1900 and 1939.  Other displays in the outbuildings include farming and craft tools, wheelwright and blacksmith workshops.

History
White Mill was built in 1760. It was marked on Andrews, Drury and Herbert's map of 1769 and the 1819–43 Ordnance Survey map. The mill was worked by the Stanley family for many years. The mill was last powered by wind in 1926. From then until 1957 it was being powered by a  oil engine.

The mill was repaired in the 1960s by Vincent Pargeter before he became a professional millwright. A pair of sails from the demolished Tower mill at Wingham was erected on the mill. The work was initially financed by Pargeter himself but in 1964, the Society for the Protection of Ancient Buildings gave a grant for the purchase of materials to repair the mill. The mill was acquired by Sandwich Borough Council in 1968, and later passed into the ownership of Kent County Council.

Description

White Mill is a three-storey smock mill on a single-storey brick base. It has four spring sails. The mill is winded by a fantail. The mill drives two pairs of millstones by wind, and a third pair is driven by an engine. Much of the machinery is made of wood, including the brake wheel, wallower, great spur wheel, and stone nuts. The millstones are overdrift.

Gallery

Millers
Thomas Stanley 1878
Stanley Brothers
Albert Stanley - 1952
References for above:-

References

External links
White Mill Rural Heritage Centre - official site
Windmill World page on the mill.

Sandwich, Kent
Windmills completed in 1760
Windmills in Kent
Grinding mills in the United Kingdom
Smock mills in England
Museums in Dover District
Mill museums in England
Agricultural museums in England
History museums in Kent
Octagonal buildings in the United Kingdom